Björnhult, Grönestad and Hästebäcken is a minor locality situated in Habo Municipality in Jönköping County, Sweden. It had 106 inhabitants in 2010. (updated 8 October 2012)

References

Populated places in Habo Municipality